Ulta Palta is a 1997 Indian Kannada film directed by N. S. Shankar and starring Ramesh Aravind, Kashi and Sushma Veer. It is based on Shakespeare's The Comedy of Errors. The music of the film was composed by V. Manohar. The film was remade in Telugu language with the same name (1998) and in Tamil as Ambuttu Imbuttu Embuttu (2005) starring Ashok Kashyap who was one of the co-producers and cinematographer of the film. The entire film was shot in Koppa, a town in Chikmagalur district of Karnataka.

Plot
Two sets of identical twins are lost in their childhood. None of them are aware of their twin being alive. One set of twins arrive to a town on work, which is where the other set of twins live and make their living. The people of the town confuse them for the latter, who is a famous industrialist in the town.  A series of misunderstandings, misplacements and confusions about the characters turn into hilarious situations and chaos in their lives.

Cast
 Ramesh Aravind as Devaraj-1 & Devaraj-2 and also the father of Devraj-1 & Devaraj-2 
 Sushma Veer as Sheela, Devaraj-1's wife
 Pooja Lokesh as Meera, Sheela's younger sister
 Pavitra Lokesh as Mohini, Devaraj-1's love interest
 Kashi as Rama-1 & Rama-2 
 Karibasavaiah as Shivanandappa's lackey
 Myna Chandru as Kumara, Mohini's admirer
 Sunetra Pandit as Rama-1's wife, Chenni, Devaraj-1's housemaid
 Girija Lokesh as the nun 
 H. G. Dattatreya as the police inspector
 Ramesh Pandit as the school friend of Devaraj-1
 Hulivana Gangadharaiah as Shivanandappa 
 Shankar Rao as Shettru, the jewellery shop owner
 Ummatthal Sathya 
 Subramanya Thememane
 Srishailan 
 Venkatachalam

Soundtrack
The music of the film was composed and lyrics written by V. Manohar except one poetry written by K. S. Narasimhaswamy.

Awards
 1997-98 : Karnataka State Film Awards
 Best Dialogue - N. S. Shankar
 Best Acting (Special Jury Award) - Kashi

References

1997 films
1990s Kannada-language films
Modern adaptations of works by William Shakespeare
Films based on The Comedy of Errors
Twins in Indian films
Indian comedy films
Kannada films remade in other languages
Films scored by V. Manohar
1997 comedy films